Christine Ongare (born 26 November 1993) is a Kenyan boxer competing in the featherweight division. She represented Kenya at the 2018 Commonwealth Games in Gold Coast, Australia winning a bronze medal thus making her the first Kenyan woman to win a Commonwealth Games medal in boxing.

Career 
Christine Ongare participated in football and acrobatics before taking up boxing in 2011 in Kenya's Kariobangi Estate

Christine Ongare competed at the 2018 Commonwealth Games in Gold Coast, Australia. She was seeded for the featherweight tournament and lost to Northern Ireland's Carly McNaul. As of February 2020, she had qualified to represent Kenya at the since postponed 2020 Summer Olympics after beating Uganda's Catherine Nanziri at the 2020 African Boxing Olympic Qualification Tournament in Dakar, Senegal.

Personal life 
Born to a single mother in Eastlands, Nairobi, Ongare herself became a mother at 12 years of age.

Appearances and honours 

 2012 AIBA Women's World Boxing Championships
 2014 Commonwealth Games, Glasgow, Scotland
 2018 Commonwealth Games, Gold Coast, Australia
2019 Africa Games, Morocco
 2020 African Boxing Olympic Qualification Tournament, Dakar, Senegal

References

External links
 
 
 
 
 
 
 

Living people
1993 births
Kenyan women boxers
Featherweight boxers
Olympic boxers of Kenya
Boxers at the 2020 Summer Olympics
Commonwealth Games bronze medallists for Kenya
Commonwealth Games medallists in boxing
Boxers at the 2014 Commonwealth Games
Boxers at the 2018 Commonwealth Games
Boxers at the 2022 Commonwealth Games
21st-century Kenyan women
Medallists at the 2018 Commonwealth Games